This is a list of companies from the countries in the Caribbean Community.

Caribbean Community companies.
List of Antiguan-Barbudan companies
List of Bahamian companies
List of Barbadian companies
List of Belizean companies
List of Dominican Republic companies
List of Grenadian companies
List of Guyanese companies
List of Haitian companies
List of Jamaican companies
List of Montserratian companies
List of Kittitian companies
List of Saint Lucian companies
List of Vincentian companies
List of Surinamese companies
List of Trinidadian companies